Xanthophyllum brevipes is a tree in the family Polygalaceae. The specific epithet  is from the Latin meaning "short foot", referring to the short petiole of the leaves.

Description
The bark is yellowish brown and smooth. The flowers are white drying to orange-brown.

Distribution and habitat
Xanthophyllum brevipes is endemic to Borneo. Its habitat is mixed dipterocarp forests from sea-level to  altitude.

References

brevipes
Endemic flora of Borneo
Trees of Borneo
Plants described in 1973